Griffith Peak is located in the Spring Mountains in Clark County of southern Nevada.

Griffith Peak is Nevada's 43rd highest peak, and the third highest peak in southern Nevada. It is within Humboldt-Toiyabe National Forest, Mount Charleston Wilderness and Spring Mountains National Recreation Area.

Griffith Peak is accessible by two primary trails: the South Loop Trail and the Harris Springs Trail. The South Loop Trail leads directly to the Griffith Saddle from which both Griffith Peak and Mount Charleston are accessible.

References 

Spring Mountains
Mountains of Nevada
Mountains of Clark County, Nevada